Kaplice is a town in Český Krumlov District in the South Bohemian Region of the Czech Republic. It has about 7,000 inhabitants. The historic town centre is well preserved and is protected by law as an urban monument zone.

Administrative parts
Villages of Blansko, Dobechov, Hradiště, Hubenov, Květoňov, Mostky, Pořešín, Pořešínec, Rozpoutí and Žďár are administrative parts of Kaplice.

Etymology
The name of the town is derived from Czech word kaplice, which meant "small church" or "chapel". Its origin is connected with Church of the Virgin Mary serving for Czech minority in the region, which stood on the site of today's Church of St. Florian.

Geography
It lies in the Gratzen Foothills. The town is situated on the Malše river. There are several ponds in the territory.

History

Middle Ages

The first written mention of Kaplice is from 1257, according to which it was property of the monastery in Milevsko. It was founded as the market village on an important trade route, connecting Upper Austria with South Bohemia. The advantageous position was the main factor of its rapid development.

In the 13th century, it became a part of Pořešín estate, founded by Bavors of Strakonice. In 1382, Kaplice became a town with all the town privileges, but remained under the influence of lords of Pořešín until 1387.

After both Kaplice and Pořešín were acquired by Oldřich II of Rosenberg, he let the Pořešín Castle burn down in 1434, so that he would not have to invest in it and pay for servants. After the Rosenbergs died out, the estates were inherited by the Schwambergs, then to be handed over to the victors of the Battle of White Mountain, the empirical general Charles Bonaventure, Count of Bucquoy. The town obtained a number of privileges which positively influenced its economic development. Nevertheless, this development had many times in the past been seriously afflicted with such catastrophes as frequent fires, desolation and robberies during the wars, especially during the Hussite Wars and Thirty Years' War. By the end of the 15th century, the town population had become German-speaking.

Austrian monarchy
After the abolition of serfdom, the town became the seat of the political and judicial district in the new administrative system. Until 1918, the town (bilingual names Kaplitz – Kaplice) was part of the Austrian monarchy (Austria side after the compromise of 1867), head of the district of the same name, one of the 94 Bezirkshauptmannschaften in Bohemia. The German name alone was used until the end of the 19th century.

Co-existence of the German-speaking majority with the Czech minority in the town was peaceful and almost without any problem. However, the growth of nationalisms at the end of the 19th century, and especially in the first half of the 20th century, raised the first serious conflicts.

First Czechoslovak Republic
After the end of World War I, Kaplice became part of the First Czechoslovak Republic. Kaplice citizens with German majority refused to recognize the border of the new Czechoslovakia and wanted to join the territory to German-Austria. Their organized armed resistance was suppressed and they did not succeed.

In 1919, Kaplice became the administrative centre of the area which included Vyšší Brod and Nové Hrady, but for its low population it was recognized only as a market town. In 1937, it was again promoted to a town.

During the first republic, Kaplice remained a town with a majority of German inhabitants. In 1938, on the basis of the Munich Agreement, Kaplice became part of Germany with Germany's annexation of the Sudetenland and was annexed to the Austrian county of Oberdonau. The Czech population had to flee.

After World War II
After the end of World War II, Kaplice fell back again to Czechoslovakia. Former Czech inhabitants returned and the German population was expelled. The town depopulated.

In 1960, Kaplice District was abolished. The town began to develop again in the 1960s. New schools, industrial factories and housing estates were built here and the population increased.

In 1994, Střítež separated and became an independent municipality.

Demographics

Sights

The oldest buildings in Kaplice are the two churches, which unusually stand side by side. Both are built in the late Gothic style. The Church of Saint Peter and Paul is documented in 1383. The Church of Saint Florian was built in 1507 and replaced a church destroyed by a fire.

The centre of Kaplice is a square with Renaissance town hall. Its current appearance is from 1852. The tower is remnant of Baroque reconstruction. Other sights on the square list a stone fountain from 1646 with a pillory, a Renaissance house decorated with sgraffito, and a large building of former brewery with Renaissance stone bossaged portal.

The ruin of Pořešín Castle is open to the public. It includes a small castle museum.

Twin towns – sister cities

Kaplice is twinned with:
 Freistadt, Austria

References

External links

Information portal of Kaplice

Cities and towns in the Czech Republic
Populated places in Český Krumlov District